This list includes localities that are in Israel that the Israeli Ministry of Interior has designated as a city council. Jerusalem includes occupied East Jerusalem. The list is based on the current index of the Israel Central Bureau of Statistics (CBS). Within Israel's system of local government, an urban municipality can be granted a city council by the Interior Ministry when its population exceeds 20,000. The term "city" does not generally refer to local councils or urban agglomerations, even though a defined city often contains only a small portion of an urban area or metropolitan area's population.

List
Israel has 16 cities with populations over 100,000, including Jerusalem and Tel Aviv-Yafo. In all, there are 77 Israeli localities granted "municipalities" (or "city") status by the Ministry of the Interior, including four Israeli settlements in the West Bank. Two more cities are planned: Kasif, a planned city to be built in the Negev, and Harish, originally a small town currently being built into a large city. The area and population of Jerusalem includes that of East Jerusalem which has been de facto annexed by Israel and incorporated within Jerusalem's municipal borders under the Jerusalem Law. This, however, is not recognized by the international community who regard East Jerusalem to be Palestinian territory held under Israeli occupation. If East Jerusalem is considered part of Israel, Tel Aviv is the country's second most populous city with 452,000 residents after Jerusalem with 919,000; if not, Tel Aviv is the most populous city before West Jerusalem with around 350,000.

The following table lists all Israeli cities by name, district, population, and area, according to the Israel Central Bureau of Statistics:

See also

Arab localities in Israel
Chronology of Aliyah in modern times
Demographics of Israel
Districts of Israel
Four Holy Cities
Jewish population by city
List of cities administered by the Palestinian Authority
List of cities of the ancient Near East
List of kibbutzim
List of largest metropolitan areas of the Middle East
List of modern names for biblical place names
List of moshavim
List of twin towns and sister cities in Israel
List of villages depopulated during the Arab–Israeli conflict
Lists of cities by country
Population displacements in Israel after 1948
Population statistics for Israeli settlements in the Gaza Strip
Population statistics for Israeli settlements in the West Bank

Notes 
General

Official spellings

References

External links 

Cities and Communities in Israel at the Israel Ministry of Tourism
Geography of Israel at the Jewish Virtual Library
Localities Numbering 5,000 Residents and More at the Israel Central Bureau of Statistics

 
Cities
Israel
Israel
Israel
Cities
Israel